Patrick Woolley is an American legal scholar working as the Beck, Redden & Secrest Professor of Law at the University of Texas School of Law.

Education 
Woolley earned a Bachelor of Arts degree from Stanford University and a Juris Doctor from Yale Law School.

Career 
Prior to joining the University of Texas as an assistant professor in 1994, Woolley practiced law at Munger, Tolles & Olson in Los Angeles. Woolley's scholarship focuses on civil procedure, conflict of laws, federal courts, and constitutional law.

References

Year of birth missing (living people)
Living people
University of Texas School of Law faculty
American lawyers
Yale Law School alumni
Stanford University alumni
American legal scholars